Events from the year 1634 in England.

Incumbents
 Monarch – Charles I
 Secretary of State – Sir John Coke
 Lord Chancellor – Thomas Coventry, 1st Baron Coventry

Events
 March – Leonard Calvert leads the first group of settlers to the new English colony of Maryland in North America
 5 May – A royal proclamation confines flying of the Union Flag (the first recorded reference to it by this name) to the king's ships; English merchant vessels are to fly the flag of England.
 7 May – William Prynne is sentenced by the Star Chamber to a £5,000 fine, life imprisonment, pillorying and the loss of part of his ears when his Histriomastix is viewed as an attack on King Charles I and Queen Henrietta Maria
 20 October – King Charles I issues writs to raise ship money from coastal ports to finance the Royal Navy

Undated
 Cornelius Vermuyden begins the draining of The Fens to reclaim farmland
 First Newmarket Gold Cup horse race
 Thomas Johnson begins publishing Mercurius Botanicus, including a list of indigenous British plants.
 The position of Keeper of the Archives is established at the University of Oxford
 The English establish a settlement at Cochin (modern-day Kochi) on the Malabar Coast

Literature
 22 January – William Davenant's comedy The Wits first performed by the King's Men at the Blackfriars Theatre
 John Ford's history play Perkin Warbeck published.

Births
 1 January – Fleetwood Sheppard, poet (died 1698)
 7 February – Robert Robartes, Viscount Bodmin, diplomat and politician (died 1682)
 23 March – Philip Smythe, 2nd Viscount Strangford, Member of Parliament (died 1708)
 25 March – George Bull, bishop of St Davids and theologian (died 1710) 
 28 March – Sir Richard Temple, 3rd Baronet, Member of Parliament (died 1697)
 8 April – Joseph Alleine, nonconformist pastor, author (died 1668)
 14 April – Sir John Reresby, 2nd Baronet, politician and diarist (died 1689)
 25 April – Robert Montagu, 3rd Earl of Manchester, politician (died 1683)
 4 May – Lady Katherine Ferrers, aristocrat and heiress (died 1660)
 7 May – Richard Legh, politician (died 1687)
 14 June – Nathaniel Bond, politician (died 1707)
 23 July – Sir John Hoskyns, 2nd Baronet, politician (died 1705)
 4 September – Robert South, churchman known for combative preaching (died  1716)
 6 September – Thomas Tryon, hatmaker (died 1703)
 7 November – Francis Winnington, Solicitor-General (died 1700)
 23 November – Paulet St John, 3rd Earl of Bolingbroke, politician (died 1711)
 25 November – Richard Slater, politician (died 1699)
 Unknown –  Roger Palmer, 1st Earl of Castlemaine, diplomat (died 1705)

Deaths
 23 March – Elizabeth Finch, 1st Countess of Winchilsea, noblewoman (born 1556)
 12 May – George Chapman, author (born c. 1559)
 25 June – John Marston, dramatist (born 1576)
 9 August – William Noy, jurist (born 1577)
 3 September – Edward Coke, colonial entrepreneur and jurist (born 1552)
 25 December – Lettice Knollys, noblewoman (born 1543)

References

 
Years of the 17th century in England